Alsvåg is a village in the municipality of Øksnes in Nordland county, Norway. Alsvåg Church is located in this village.

References

Øksnes
Villages in Nordland
Populated places of Arctic Norway